Delvin Pinheiro Frederico (born 26 September 1995), is a Dutch professional footballer who plays as a right back or winger.

Career
Born in Rotterdam, Pinheiro Frederico played youth football for Sparta Rotterdam. After a spell in Dutch amateur football, including with HBS Craeyenhout, he turned professional in Thailand, playing with Buriram United and Chainat Hornbill.

After returning to HBS Craeyenhout in August 2018, he left the club again in May 2019.

Personal life
His mother is Thai.

References

1995 births
Living people
Dutch footballers
Sparta Rotterdam players
HBS Craeyenhout players
Delvin Pinheiro Frederico
Delvin Pinheiro Frederico
Delvin Pinheiro Frederico
Association football defenders
Dutch expatriate footballers
Dutch expatriate sportspeople in Thailand
Expatriate footballers in Thailand
Nike Academy players
Footballers from Rotterdam
Thai expatriate sportspeople in the Netherlands